Antonius Johannes Cornelius "Cor" Herkströter (born 21 August 1937) is a former chairman of Royal Dutch Shell.

Cor Herkströter was born in Venlo. He studied economics and accountancy at the School of Economics in Rotterdam (now Erasmus University Rotterdam). After graduating, he joined Billiton mining company which was latterly taken over by Shell. During his career at Shell he rose to the most senior executive position at the company, the Chairman of the Committee of Managing Directors, on 1 July 1993.

In 1996, he reorganized the central offices in The Hague and London and laboratories in Amsterdam and Rijswijk. He retired in 1998.

After his tenure at Royal Dutch Shell, he became President Commissioner of the ING Group.

References

1937 births
Chief Executive Officers of Shell plc
Erasmus University Rotterdam alumni
Living people
People from Venlo